Overlooked is an album by American alternative rock band Caroline's Spine.  It includes new songs along with some songs that were rerecorded and slightly updated in style, tone, and quality.

Track listing
 "End Up"  – 3:32
 "July"  – 2:38
 "Overlooked"  – 3:43
 "Drift Away"  – 3:16
 "Soldier Song"  – 3:14
 "Angels"  – 4:14
 "Know Me at All"  – 3:33
 "Never Left"  – 3:12
 "Please Let Me Go"  – 3:20
 "Like it or Not"  – 2:49
 "Dirty Work"  – 3:34
 "Quarter Century New"  – 2:51

Band Lineup
Jimmy Newquist - vocals, guitar, bass
Mark Haugh - guitar, backing vocals
Jason Gilardi - drums and percussion
Scott Jones - bass, backing vocals

Caroline's Spine albums